Anti-Soviet partisans may refer to various resistance movements that opposed the Soviet Union and its satellite states at various periods during the 20th century.

During Russian Civil War and Interwar Period 
Basmachi movement
Green armies
August Uprising
Forest Guerrillas
Revolutionary Insurgent Army of Ukraine

During Second World War and its aftermath 
Chechen rebels
Cursed soldiers (Poland)
Guerrilla war in the Baltic states
Latvian partisans
Lithuanian partisans
Estonian partisans
Goryani (Bulgaria)
Anti-communist resistance in Poland (1944–1953)
Romanian anti-communist resistance movement
Armata Neagră (Moldova)
Ukrainian Insurgent Army
Organisations formed by Nazi Germany
GULAG Operation
Black Cats (Belarus)
Crusaders (guerrilla) (Croatia)
Werwolf (Germany)

During the Cold War 
Afghan Mujahideen
NATO Operation Gladio

See also
Anti-communism
Eastern European anti-Communist insurgencies
Operation Priboi
Partisan (military)
Resistance during World War II

References

Anti-communism
Anti-communist guerrilla organizations
Battles and operations of the Eastern Front of World War II
Eastern European World War II resistance movements
Intelligence operations